Khaan Quest is an annual military exercise held in Mongolia for a week in the summer. It brings together over a dozen foreign militaries to engage in the sharing of practices for multinational peacekeeping operations. In the exercise, personnel gain United Nations peacekeeper training as well as certification for support of peacekeeping operations. According to Mongolian Armed Forces Chief of Staff Tserendejidiin Byambajav, "Khaan Quest has become one of the signature training events for the participating nations."

Since its establishment in 2003, it has been held in the Five Hills Training Area. It only became an international exercise in 2006, originally being a joint exercise between the Mongolian Armed Forces and the United States Indo-Pacific Command. It is usually opened by an opening ceremony attended by the President of Mongolia.

Gallery

See also
Vostok 2018

References

External links

Military exercises and wargames
Military exercises involving the United States
Military exercises involving China
2003 in Mongolia
2004 in Mongolia
2005 in Mongolia
2006 in Mongolia
2007 in Mongolia
2008 in Mongolia
2009 in Mongolia
2010 in Mongolia
2011 in Mongolia
2012 in Mongolia
2013 in Mongolia
2014 in Mongolia
2015 in Mongolia
2016 in Mongolia
2017 in Mongolia
2018 in Mongolia
2019 in Mongolia
Military of Mongolia